The 1999 UEFA Futsal Championship was the second official edition of the UEFA-governed European Championship for national futsal teams. It was held in Spain, between 22 February and 28 February 1999, in one venue located in the city of Granada.

Qualification

Qualified teams

Venue

Squads

Final tournament

Group A

Group B

Knockout stage

Semi-finals

Third place play-off

Final

External links
 UEFA.com

 
UEFA
1999
International futsal competitions hosted by Spain
1998–99 in Spanish futsal
Sport in Granada
UEFA Futsal Championship